is a railway station on the Ainokaze Toyama Railway Line in Takaoka, Toyama, Japan which is operated by the  third-sector railway operating company Ainokaze Toyama Railway from March 2018.

Lines

Station layout
The station has two side platforms serving two tracks, with station entrances on either side.

Adjacent stations

History
A ground-breaking ceremony was held at the site of the new station on 25 December 2016.

The name for the new station was formally announced on 15 February 2017. The station opened in March 2018.

Passenger statistics
The station is forecast to be used by an average of around 1,800 passengers daily.

See also
 List of railway stations in Japan

References

External links

 Ainokaze Toyama Railway news release 

Stations of Ainokaze Toyama Railway
Railway stations in Toyama Prefecture
Railway stations in Japan opened in 2018